Tiers is a comune (municipality) in the province of South Tyrol in northern Italy, located in the Tierser Tal about  east of the city of Bolzano.

Geography

Tiers borders the following municipalities: Kastelruth, Karneid, Völs am Schlern, Welschnofen, Campitello di Fassa, Mazzin, and Sèn Jan di Fassa.

History

Coat-of-arms
The emblem is formed by a bend, helmet shaped, of argent and azure on gules background. It is the insignia of Lords of Velseck who ruled the village from 1200 until 1470 for the Bishops of Brixen. The emblem was granted in 1968.

Society

Linguistic distribution
According to the 2011 census, 98.15% of the population speak German, 1.20% Italian and 0.65% Ladin as first language.

Demographic evolution

References

External links
 Homepage of the municipality
 Tiers am Rosengarten

Municipalities of South Tyrol